This list contains "traditional" musical instruments used in Nepal. Instruments overlap with nearby countries, including India and Tibet. An example is the Sarangi, a common bow Indian instrument. Although the Nepali people have their own local variant Sarangi (Nepal), both instruments are known in Nepal. Some of the instrument are madal,  maddlam , dholak . In such cases where instruments were imported in ancient times, or when both varieties are played in Nepal, both can be included on the list. New instruments of Nepali origin may be included, as well as modern recreations of " extinct "  instruments. Modern imports such as the western guitar are not included.

There are hundreds of Nepali musical instruments and they are not standardized. When considering seemingly identical instruments, the languages, region of origin, musician's ethnicity  and local traditions may affect the instrument's identity and how it is played.

Research avenues

Many Nepali folk instruments  or lokabaja (नेपाली लोकबाजा) date back into prehistory or inaccessible history.  General histories of musical instruments, such as History of Musical Instruments by Kurt Sachs, have little to say directly about Nepal. Sachs focused two chapters on India, and when addressing the ranasrnga, on Northern India. When instruments used in Nepal were included in Sachs' book, such as drums with hooked sticks (p. 157), the dameru (p. 159), the lute with a barb on its sides (160-161), the sarangi (226), and the ranasrnga (p. 228), the organizational focus was on India, or "North India."

JSTORE, an online repository of academic journals has articles. An example by Thomas O. Ballinger and Purna Harsha Bajracharya, Nepalese Musical Instruments, Southwestern Journal of Anthropology, Published by: The University of Chicago Press, Vol. 16, No. 4 (Winter, 1960), pp. 398–416 (19 pages). Thomas compares the instruments he found with that found in books by A. Campbell and Daniel Wright. Gives descriptions of instruments.
History of Nepal, by Daniel Wright, Cambridge: University Press, 1877.
Notes on the Musical Instruments and Agricultural and Other Instruments of the Nepalese, by A. Campbell, Journal of the Asiatic Society of Bengal, Vol. 6 (1837), pp. 953-963.

The Grove Dictionary of Musical Instruments is a more comprehensive resource, with many instruments having been documented by ethnomusicologists. Random entries for Nepali instruments include Arbajo, Damaha, the Kingdom of Nepal [and its instruments and international music relationships] and the ghanta (both large "male" bells and smaller "female" handbells. This resource requires either a subscription (not inexpensive), access to a university library, or purchase of the $995 set of books.

The Garland Encyclopedia of World Music, Volume 5: South Asia, the Indian subcontinent does address Nepal directly in a chapter.

Museum and museum catalogs: In 1995, a local project was begun in Nepal, to document the folk instruments there. Ram Prasad Kadel began to visit different parts of his country and collect examples of instruments that he found. He talked to musicians and made recordings. In 1997, he founded the Nepali Folk Instruments Museum, which opened to the public in 2002 in Kathmandu. Kadel wrote two books, catalogues of some of the museum's instruments. Nepali Lokbaja or Folk Musical Instruments of Nepal was published in 2004. The Nepali-language book contains entries and images for 375 instruments. The language made the contents inaccessible to most readers outside Nepal. In 2007 Kadel's Musical Instruments of Nepal was published, an English-language book with 362 Nepali instruments and more detailed pictures. The book is the only book in the English language whose focus is Nepali folk musical instruments. Today his museum has more than 40,000 hours of recordings.

Membranophones

Tambourines and frame drums

Kettle drums and single-headed drums

Hourglass drums

Long two-headed drums

Multiple heads nested
 Tri Taal, block with nested drum-heads

Idiophones

Bells
Yakuchaa Babhu, bell
 Ghote, circlet of bells on a leather thong.

Cymbals

Gongs
 TainNain. Gong.
 Tinimuni. Metal percussion triangle.

Jaw harps

Jingles, clappers, struck objects

Chordophones

Tube zithers and raft zithers
 Bhante Maadal. 2-String bamboo drum zither.
Tunjaai. Tube zithers connected together into a single instrument, a raft zither, hanging from the shoulder and plucked with a plectrum. Made from Thysanolaena maxima.
 Yalambar (यलम्बर) / Yalamber Baja (tube zither-drum) यलम्बर (बाजा)

Aerophones

Trumpets

Flutes, panpipes

Reed instruments

Unidentified
 Baya
 Dafali
 Ghangling
 Girnal
 Handiya
 Horel
 Ilambu
 Irlung pipari
 Jhajhar
 Kaha
 Khusyaha
 kumuna
 Lawa
 Paluwa
 Paschima
 Tahinahi
 Tunguna

See also

Dapha music
Gai Jatra
Gunla Bajan
Kumha Pyakhan dance
Malshree dhun
Naumati Baaja
Newar music
Panche baja

References

External links
Information about music, instrument and a caste allowed to play them.
Page talks about state of research of Nepali musical instruments.  May be source for part of this list.

Nepal
Nepalese musical instruments 
musical instruments